Opposition to NATO tends to mainly come from pacifist organisation, workers movements, environmental groups and green parties, and socialist and communist political parties. They believe NATO to be antithetical to global peace and stability, environmentally destructive, and an obstacle to nuclear disarmament. There are also libertarians who oppose NATO, believing to be antithetical to the ideals of limited government and non-interventionism.

Anti-NATO parties and organizations

Belgium
 Workers' Party of Belgium

Czech Republic
 Rally for the Republic – Republican Party of Czechoslovakia
 Workers' Party (Czech Republic)

Croatia
 Human Shield (political party)

Denmark
 Red–Green Alliance (Denmark)

France
 Popular Republican Union (2007)
 La France Insoumise
 French Communist Party

Germany 
 Die Linke

Greece
 Communist Party of Greece
New Left Current
Socialist Workers Party (Greece)
ANTARSYA

Hungary 
 Hungarian Workers' Party

Iceland 
Left-Green Movement

Ireland
 People Before Profit
 Sinn Féin

Norway
 Socialist Left Party (Norway)
 Red Party (Norway)

Poland
 National Revival of Poland

Portugal
 Left Bloc (Portugal)
 Portuguese Communist Party

Slovakia
 Communist Party of Slovakia
 Kotleba – People's Party Our Slovakia

Slovenia
 Slovenian National Party
The Left

Spain
 EH Bildu
 United Left (Spain)

Sweden
 Alternative for Sweden
 Green Party
 Swedish Peace and Arbitration Society
 Left Party

Serbia
 Serbian Radical Party
 Serbian Party Oathkeepers

Moldova
 Party of Socialists of the Republic of Moldova

Montenegro
 New Serb Democracy

Russia
 Liberal Democratic Party of Russia
 United Russia

Turkey
 Patriotic Party (Turkey)

United Kingdom
 Campaign for Nuclear Disarmament
 Plaid Cymru
 Scottish Green Party
 Scottish Socialist Party

United States

 The Future of Freedom Foundation
 Democratic Socialists of America
 Socialist Party USA

See also
 2006 anti-NATO protests in Feodosia
 Withdrawal from NATO
 1949 anti-NATO riot in Iceland
 NATO debate in the Scottish National Party

References

 
NATO
NATO-related lists